Xylosandrus germanus, known generally as the alnus ambrosia beetle or black stem borer, is a species of ambrosia beetle in the family Curculionidae. The black stem borer is native to eastern Asia, but is an invasive species in Europe and North America. It carries an associated ambrosia fungus, Ambrosiella grosmanniae.

References

Further reading

External links

 

Scolytinae
Articles created by Qbugbot
Beetles described in 1894